Józef Jan Ramlau (born 17 December 1958 in Chojnice) is a former Polish politician who was a Voivode of Kuyavian-Pomeranian Voivodeship (2006) and a Member of Toruń County Council (1998-2002).

Between 1996 and 2002 he was a Secretary of Toruń City Office. In 1998 local election he joined the Toruń County Council I term.

In 2002 local election he was a candidate for Wójt (= Vogt) of Gmina Obrowo. He was one of two candidate and Ramlau polled 590 votes only (16.62%) New Wójt was Andrzej Wieczyński.

After appointed of Kazimierz Marcinkiewicz Cabinet, Ramlau was nominated as Voivode of Kuyavian-Pomeranian Voivodeship (wojewoda kujawsko-pomorski). He was a Voivode between 26 January 2006 and 24 July 2006.

See also 
 Kuyavian-Pomeranian Voivodeship

References

External links 
 (pl) Kuyavian-Pomeranian Voivodeship Office webside

1958 births
Living people
People from Chojnice
Voivodes of Kuyavian-Pomeranian Voivodeship